Graham McKenzie (11 October 1934 – June 1995) was an Australian fencer. He competed in the individual sabre event at the 1956 Summer Olympics in Melbourne, Australia.

References

1934 births
1995 deaths
Australian male fencers
Olympic fencers of Australia
Fencers at the 1956 Summer Olympics